Terry Simpson (born August 30, 1943) is a Canadian former professional ice hockey player and a former NHL head coach.

Born in Brantford, Ontario, Simpson only played one season of professional ice hockey in 1964–65 for the Jacksonville Rockets of the EHL. He was the head coach of the New York Islanders, Philadelphia Flyers, and Winnipeg Jets.

Simpson had a notable coaching career in junior hockey for 10 years with the Prince Albert Raiders. He led the team to seven consecutive Anavet Cups and four Manitoba Centennial Cup titles. After the Raiders joined the Western Hockey League, he led them to the 1985 Memorial Cup championship.

Due to his success with the Raiders, the city of Prince Albert named the road leading to the Art Hauser Centre "Terry Simpson Lane" in his honour.

Coaching record

References

External links

1943 births
Living people
Canadian ice hockey coaches
Canadian ice hockey players
Ice hockey people from Ontario
New York Islanders coaches
Philadelphia Flyers coaches
Prince Albert Raiders coaches
Red Deer Rebels coaches
Sportspeople from Brantford
Toronto Maple Leafs coaches
Winnipeg Jets (1972–1996) coaches